Mordshunger is a 2008 television film directed by Robert Adrian Pejo. It is based on the 1996 German novel of the same name (1996) written by Frank Schätzing.

Cast
In alphabetical order
Christian Blümel as Panne
Michou Friesz as Kriminalrätin Truckenbrodt
Kerstin Gähte as Inka von Barneck
Niki Greb as Maria Nikolaj
Henry Hübchen as Fritz von Barneck, Max Hartmann
Waldemar Kobus as Stephan Bronski
Heinz W. Krückeberg as Butler Schmitz
Marleen Lohse as Marion Ried
Hans Werner Meyer as Romanus Cüpper
Heiko Pinkowski as Gopper
Lars Rudolph as Kurt Brauner
Richard van Weyden as Dr. Heinz Hochstädter
Stefan Weinert as Herrenausstatter Schramm
Bettina Zimmermann as Eva Feldkamp
Johannes Zirner as Jan Rabenhorst

External links

2008 films
2000s crime films
2008 television films
Crime television films
Films based on crime novels
Films based on German novels
2000s German-language films
German-language television shows
German television films
Television shows based on German novels
RTL (German TV channel) original programming